Agostino Barbarigo or simply Barbarigo was the name of at least two ships of the Italian Navy named in honour of Agostino Barbarigo and may refer to:

 , a  launched in 1917 and discarded in 1928.
 , a  launched in 1938 and sunk in 1943.

Italian Navy ship names